The Secretary General of the Union of South American Nations is the legal representative of the Secretariat of the Union of South American Nations (USAN).

History
The position was established by the UNASUR Constitutive Treaty and the first Secretary General was designated on 4 May 2010.

Function
The Secretary General of UNASUR is proposed by the Foreign Ministers council, and designated by the Heads of State and Government council for a two-year term, renewable once. A Secretary General cannot be of the same nationality in succession.

The Secretary General exercises the legal representation of the UNASUR Secretariat. The officials selection for the latter requires an equitative representation between UNASUR Member States. It also requires an equitative representation, as much as possible, along gender, language and ethnic criteria.
The tasks of the Secretary General are:

 Helping the Heads of State council, the Foreign Ministers council, the Delegates council, and the Pro Tempore President, in the accomplishment of their tasks.
 Proposing initiatives and monitoring the adequate functioning of the UNASUR organizations.
 Preparing and presenting the Annual Report, and respective reports, to UNASUR organizations meetings.
 Serving as the legal depositary of UNASUR Agreements, and allowing its publication.
 Preparing the annual budget for the Delegates Council consideration, and adopting measures for good management and administration, as needed.
 Projecting reglamentations for the Secretariat, and submitting them to the pertaining bodies for consideration and approval.
 Coordinating the labor bestowed on it by UNASUR organizations along with other Latin American and the Caribbean integration and cooperation entities.
 Executing, according to reglamentations, every necessary legal action for the good management and administration of the Secretariat.

List of Secretaries-General

References

External links
Official site

2010 establishments in South America